Verena Stuffer (born 23 June 1984 in Bozen, Italy) is a South Tyrolean former alpine skier from Italy.

Career
She competed for Italy at the 2014 Winter Olympics in the alpine skiing events. She also made a total of 148 FIS Alpine Ski World Cup starts and competed at the 2009, 2011 and 2017 World Championships. She retired at the end of the 2017-18 season, making her final World Cup start in a super-G at Crans-Montana in March 2018.

References

External links
 
 

1984 births
Living people
Olympic alpine skiers of Italy
Alpine skiers at the 2014 Winter Olympics
Italian female alpine skiers
Sportspeople from Bolzano
Alpine skiers of Centro Sportivo Carabinieri
20th-century Italian women
21st-century Italian women